Waddle is a populated place in Patton Township, Centre County, Pennsylvania, United States, approximately   northwest of State College, and located on Buffalo Run Road (Route 550).

References

Unincorporated communities in Centre County, Pennsylvania
Unincorporated communities in Pennsylvania